An annular solar eclipse occurred on July 14, 1749. A solar eclipse occurs when the Moon passes between Earth and the Sun, thereby totally or partly obscuring the image of the Sun for a viewer on Earth. An annular solar eclipse occurs when the Moon's apparent diameter is smaller than the Sun's, blocking most of the Sun's light and causing the Sun to look like an annulus (ring). An annular eclipse appears as a partial eclipse over a region of the Earth thousands of kilometres wide.

Description
The eclipse was visible in much of South America except for Guyaranquil, New Granada (now in Ecuador) and around it and the southern tip, Florida (then also as Spanish Florida) and the Caribbean, the Atlantic, much of Africa except for the Ottoman lands of a part of Tunis including Philippeville (now Bizerte) and Carthage, Cyrenaica, Egypt and East Nubia as well as the Somali Peninsula and much of Spain and Portugal except for the Pyrenees.  It was also visible in a small part of the Indian Ocean and hundreds of miles (or kilometers) offshore from Antarctica. It was part of solar saros 132.

The umbral portion which was as far as 141 km (88 km) included the northern Amazon, Roraima, British Guiana (now Guyana), Surinam (then also Dutch Guyana) and French Guiana in South America, in Africa it was 85–95 miles (135–150 km) south of the island of Santiago in (Portuguese) Cape Verde, on the mainland, it included the Bijagós Archipelago, Conakry, present-day Ivory Coast and Ghana, Angola, Great Zimbabwe (now Zimbabwe) and Mozambique, off the mainland, it included the southernmost tip of Madagascar. The greatest occurred just over a mile (2 km) west of Koulikoro in Tonkpi in present-day Ivory Coast at 7.8 N, 7.2 W at 12:19 UTC and lasted for over 4 minutes.

The eclipse showed up to 50% obscuration in Santo Domingo (now in the Dominican Republic), Rio de Oro, the Tuareg lands, the fringes of Mali, Songhai, Bornu, Wadai (now part of Chad), Kivu, Uganda, the Kilimanjaro and the Serengeti regions (now part of Tanzania) and on the other side the edges of the Amazon, Tocantins and Recife in Brazil and the southernmost area of Africa.

The eclipse started in South America with a bit of the Pacific Ocean around it and ended at sunset east of the Mascarene Islands (compromising Réunion and Mauritius).

The subsolar marking was in Mali.

In parts of the world, the eclipse was not seen in some areas in areas that had monsoon rains mainly within the rim areas.

See also 
 List of solar eclipses in the 18th century

References

External links 
 Google interactive maps
 Solar eclipse data

1749 7 14
1749 in science
1749 07 14
July events